El Jocotillo Airport  is an airport serving several small towns and villages in southern Sonsonate Department, El Salvador.

See also

Transport in El Salvador
List of airports in El Salvador

References

External links
 OpenStreetMap - El Jocotillo Airport
 HERE/Nokia - El Jocotillo
 FallingRain - El Jocotillo Airport

Airports in El Salvador